Telicota ohara, the northern large darter,  is a butterfly of the family Hesperiidae. It is found in the Oriental and Australian Regions, but not on the Pacific islands.

The wingspan is about 30 mm.

The larvae feed on Flagellaria indica. It constructs a shelter from a rolled leaf in which it hides by day. At night it emerges to feed on the base of the leaves around the shelter.

Subspecies
Telicota ohara ohara (Plötz, 1883) – dark darter (Australia)
Telicota ohara formosana Fruhstorfer, 1911 (Hong Kong, Taiwan)
Telicota ohara jania Evans, 1949 (Marinduque, Mindanao, Mindoro, Negros, Palawan, Polillo, Samar)
Telicota ohara jix (Sikkim, Japan)
Telicota ohara vedanga (Java)
Telicota ohara jactus (Borneo)
Telicota ohara iona (Buru)
Telicota ohara ixion (Upper Aroa River)

External links
Australian Faunal Directory
Australian Insects

Taractrocerini
Butterflies of Indochina
Butterflies described in 1883